The 5.6.7.8's is a 1994 studio album by the Japanese rock band the 5.6.7.8's. It includes "I Walk Like Jayne Mansfield", one of three songs by the band heard in the 2003 film Kill Bill: Volume 1.

Track listing

Reception
Karen E. Graves of AllMusic gave the album a score of four out of five stars, writing that, "the group's carefree sound and merry mangling of English are infectiously fun for those who like their rock & roll to be a little bit more bubblegum, favoring style over substance."

References

External links
 [ AllMusicGuide page for the album]

1994 albums
The 5.6.7.8's albums